Kanjikuzhi is a census town and Panchayat in Alappuzha district of Kerala State, India.

Demographics
As of 2011 Census, Kanjikuzhi had a population of 23,681 which constitutes 11,566 males and 12,115 females. The average sex ratio was 1047 lower than the state average of 1084. In Kanjikuzhi, 8.6% of the population was under 6 years of age. Kanjikkuzhi had an average literacy of  97.64% higher than the state average of 94%: male literacy was 98.86% and female literacy was 96.46%.

Administration
Kanjikkuzhi Grama Panchayat is a part of Kanjikkuzhi Block Panchayat. Kanjikkuzhi Panchayat is politically part of Cherthala (State Assembly constituency) under Alappuzha Loksabha constituency.

References

Cities and towns in Alappuzha district